Juliane Köhler (born 6 August 1965) is a German theatre, television and film actress. She was born in Göttingen to a puppeteer. During the period from 1985 to 1988, she studied under Uta Hagen in New York City and attended HB Studio. She also received ballet instruction in Munich. Since her first appearance at Hanover's Lower Saxon State Theatre in 1988, she has regularly appeared in German theatre productions. She performed in an ensemble cast of the Bavarian State Theatre during 1993–1997. She left the company because her filming of Aimée & Jaguar interfered with rehearsals for a production of Das Käthchen von Heilbronn. She later returned to Munich to participate with the Munich Kammerspiele.

She has starred in the 1999 film Aimée & Jaguar (as Lilly Wust, or Aimée); the 2001 film Nowhere in Africa (as Jettel Redlich); the 2004 film Downfall (as Eva Braun); the 2008 film Haber as Clara, the wife of Fritz Shimon Haber; Christina in Eden Is West (2009) and starred in Two Lives (2012) as Katrine Evensen Myrdal.

Selected filmography

Awards

1998 Bavarian Film Award for Best Actress, Aimée & Jaguar.
1999 49th Berlin International Film Festival - Silver Bear for Best Actress
2014 Two Lives was Germany's official submission to the Best Foreign Language Film category of the 86th Academy Awards in 2014.

References

External links 

 
 

1965 births
Living people
German film actresses
Actors from Göttingen
Waldorf school alumni
Best Actress German Film Award winners
Silver Bear for Best Actress winners
German television actresses
20th-century German actresses
21st-century German actresses
German stage actresses